The following is a timeline of the history of the city of Albuquerque, New Mexico, US.

18th-19th centuries
 1706 – Town founded as a trading post between the Tiwa Puebloan peoples and the Hispanos in Nuevo México by Francisco Cuervo y Valdés for New Spain.
 1793 – San Felipe de Neri Church built.
 1837 – Unrest.
 1846 – U.S. army fort built.
 1850 – Town becomes part of U.S. New Mexico Territory.
 1862 – Town occupied by Confederate troops before being retaken by the Union Army.
 1867 – Military post closes.
 1871 – Menaul School established.
 1873 – Jesuit College established.
 1879 – Albuquerque Academy, now known as "Albuquerque High School," established (not to be confused with the present-day Albuquerque Academy).
 1880
 Atchison, Topeka and Santa Fe Railway depot built near town.
 New town platted.
 Albuquerque Daily Journal newspaper begins publication.
 Albuquerque Indian School and Albuquerque Street Railway Company established.
 1881 – Territorial Exposition held.
 1882
 First Methodist Episcopal Church built in new town.
 Albuquerque Browns baseball team and St. Vincent Academy established.
 Park Van Tassel makes the first balloon flight in New Mexico Territory on July 4 at New Town.
 1883
 Germania club founded.
 Ladies' Library Association active.
 1885
 New town of Albuquerque chartered.
 Henry Jaffa elected mayor of new town.
 1889 – University of New Mexico founded.
 1890 – Population: 3,785.
 1891
 New Albuquerque incorporated as a city.
 El Defensor del Pueblo newspaper begins publication.
 1894 – Harwood Industrial School established.
 1895 – La Bandera Americana newspaper begins publication.
 1897 – El Nuevo Mundo newspaper begins publication.
 1899 – Southwestern Brewery and Ice Company building constructed.

20th century
 1901 – Albuquerque Public Library opens.
 1902 – Alvarado Hotel in business.
 1903
 Albuquerque Business College established.
 American Lumber Company mill opens.
 1904 – Electric streetcar begins operating.
 1906 – Southwest Presbyterian Sanatorium founded.
 1910 – Population: 11,020.
 1912
 City becomes part of the new State of New Mexico.
 New Mexico State Fair begins.
 Albuquerque Independent Society formed.
 1914
 Albuquerque High School building constructed.
 Home Circle Club chartered.
 1917 – City Charter adopted.
 1919 – New Mexico Workers Chronicle begins publication.
 1920 – People's Sanatorium opens.
 1922 – First National Bank Building (Albuquerque) constructed.
 1924 – Sunshine Theatre opens.
 1925 – Santa Fe Railway Shops (Albuquerque) built.
 1926 – Courthouse relocated to New Town from Old Town.
 1927
 Rio Grande Zoo opens.
 KiMo Theater built.
 1928
 Oxnard Field, Albuquerque's first airport, is constructed.
 KGGM radio begins broadcasting.
 1929
 First commercial airline service by Western Air Express and Transcontinental Air Transport
 West Mesa Airport constructed.
 1930 – Transcontinental Air Transport and Western Air Express merge to become TWA.
 1932 – Museum of Anthropology of the University of New Mexico established.
 1933 – KKOB (AM) radio headquartered in city.
 1934 – Continental Airlines begins service.
 1936 – Albuquerque Little Theater dedicated.
 1938 – Lobo Theater and New Mexico State Fair grounds open.
 1939
 Albuquerque Municipal Airport constructed.
 Hilton Hotel built.
 1942 – Kirtland Air Force Base established.
 1942-1944 – Royal Air Force cadets, flying from the British base at Terrell, Texas, fly to Albuquerque frequently on training flights, using it as a stand-in for Warsaw, Poland.
 1943 – POW Camp Albuquerque established.
 1946 – U.S. military Sandia Base (nuclear weapons installation) active.
 1947 – Old Town Historical Society established.
 1948 – Ernie Pyle House/Library branch established.
 1949 – Old Town annexed to city.
 1954 – Simms Building constructed.
 1956 – Albuquerque Petroleum Club founded.
 1957 – Tingley Coliseum dedicated.
 1959 – Uncle Cliff's Kiddieland opens.
 1960 – New Mexico Genealogical Society headquartered in city.
 1961
 Winrock Shopping Center in business.
 Bank of New Mexico Building constructed.
 TWA begins the first commercial jet service with the Boeing 707 and the Convair 880.
 1963
 Circle Autoscope Drive-In cinema opens.
 First National Bank Building East constructed.
 Albuquerque Municipal Airport renamed to Albuquerque Sunport
 1965
 New terminal opens at the Albuquerque Sunport.
 Coronado Center shopping mall in business.
 Albuquerque Press Club founded.
 1967 – Albuquerque Museum of Art and History established.
 1970 – Anti-war protest.
 1972
 Albuquerque International Balloon Fiesta begins.
 Glenwood Hills Association established.
 1974
 City adopts mayor-council form of government.
 TWA begins the first jumbo jet aircraft service with the Lockheed 1011.
 1976 – Indian Pueblo Cultural Center opens.
 1979
 National Solar Thermal Test Facility established.
 TWA begins the first nonstop flights to New York.
 American Airlines begins service.
 1980
 Southwest Airlines begins service.
 Population: 331,767.
 1982 United Airlines begins service.
 1983 Delta Air Lines begins service.
 1986
 Albuquerque Petroleum Building constructed.
 New Mexico Museum of Natural History and Science founded.
 1987-1989 Albuquerque International Sunport undergoes a major expansion.
 1990
 Albuquerque Plaza built.
 American International Rattlesnake Museum opens.
 Population: 384,736.
 1991 – National Museum of Nuclear Science & History chartered.
 1993 – ¡Explora! Science Center and Children's Museum opens.
 1994
 Albuquerque Poetry Slam begins.
 1996
 April: City website online.
 Rio Grande Botanic Garden and Albuquerque Aquarium open.
 Cottonwood Mall (Albuquerque, New Mexico) in business.
 1997 – Jim Baca elected mayor.

21st century

 2000 – National Hispanic Cultural Center opens.
 2002 – Alvarado Transportation Center opens.
 2003 – Metropolitan Courthouse built.
 2004 – Albuquerque Sikh Gurudwara established.
 2005
 Duke City Derby (roller derby) league formed.
 Anderson-Abruzzo Albuquerque International Balloon Museum opens.
 ¡Globalquerque! music fest begins.
 2007 – Alamosa Skatepark built.
 2009 – Richard J. Berry becomes mayor.
 2010 – Population: 545,852.
 2011 – I-25/Paseo Del Norte interchange planned.
 2012 – Population: 555,417.
 2013 – I-25/Paseo Del Norte interchange construction started.
 2015 – Panhandler jobs program begins.
 2017 – Tim Keller is elected Mayor

See also
 Albuquerque history
 List of mayors of Albuquerque
 List of historic landmarks in Albuquerque
 National Register of Historic Places listings in Bernalillo County, New Mexico

References

Bibliography

Published in the 19th century
 
 
 
 
 

Published in the 20th century
 Hudspeth Directory Company. Hudspeth's Albuquerque City Directory. El Paso: 1901, 1904, 1907–1956.
 
 H.B. Hening and E. Dana Johnson. Albuquerque, New Mexico, Chief City of a New Empire in the Great Southwest. Albuquerque, 1908.
 
 
 
 
 
 Marc Simmons. Albuquerque: A Narrative History. Albuquerque: UNM Press, 1982.
  (fulltext via Open Library)
 
 
 

Published in the 21st century
 . circa 2004

External links
 
 
 Items related to Albuquerque, various dates (via Digital Public Library of America)
 Items related to Albuquerque, various dates (via U.S. Library of Congress, Prints & Photos division)

Years in New Mexico
albuquerque
 
albuquerque